Mariquina is a 2014 Philippine independent film set in the City of Marikina, starring Mylene Dizon, Ricky Davao, and Barbie Forteza, directed by Milo Sogueco.

Entered the New Breed category of the 10th Cinemalaya Philippine Independent Film Festival, the film tells the story of a Marikina shoemaker's daughter coming to terms with her grief in the wake of her father's suicide.

Forteza received Cinemalaya's Best Supporting Actress award in the New Breed category.

The film's screenplay was written by Jerrold Tarog, based on a story written by Sogueco, Henry Burgos, and Gay Ace Domingo.  Sasha Palomares served as director of photography, earning critical praise along with Sogueco for the film's cinematography.

Other prominently featured cast members include Che Ramos, Bing Pimintel, Dennis Padilla, and Mel Kimura.  Former Philippine First Lady Imelda Marcos also appears as herself in a short cameo.

References 

2014 independent films
Philippine independent films
Philippine New Wave
2014 films